Senat may refer to:
 senat, sénat, and senát, meaning "senate" in multiple languages
 Senet, also called senat, an ancient Egyptian board game
 Aurus Senat, a Russian full-size luxury sedan

People 
 Deadrin Senat (born 1994), American football player
 Greg Senat (born 1994), American football player

See also 
 Senate (disambiguation)
 Senet (disambiguation)